Goose Creek is a stream in Louisa and Washington counties, Iowa, in the United States. It is a tributary of the Iowa River.

Goose Creek was the home to a large flock of wild geese, hence the name.

See also
List of rivers of Iowa

References

Rivers of Louisa County, Iowa
Rivers of Washington County, Iowa
Rivers of Iowa